Geoffrey Grant may refer to:
Geoff Grant (born 1970), tennis player
Geoff Grant (footballer) (1914–1973), Australian rules footballer

See also
Jeff Grant (born 1958), New Zealand politician